Eric Martin (born 31 March 1946) is a Scottish former professional footballer who played as a goalkeeper. He made 248 Football League appearances for Southampton between 1967 and 1975.

He also played both outdoor and indoors in the North American Soccer League for the Washington Diplomats from 1975 to 1979.

References

External links
Eric Martin profile on ex-Saints website
NASL stats

1946 births
Living people
Footballers from Perth, Scotland
Association football goalkeepers
Scottish footballers
Scottish expatriate footballers
Dunfermline Athletic F.C. players
Southampton F.C. players
Scottish Football League players
English Football League players
Washington Diplomats (NASL) players
North American Soccer League (1968–1984) players
North American Soccer League (1968–1984) indoor players
Cowdenbeath F.C. players
Expatriate soccer players in the United States
Scottish expatriate sportspeople in the United States
Blairhall Colliery F.C. players